Orlets was a series of Russian, and previously Soviet photoreconnaissance satellites derived from and intended to augment the Yantar series of spacecraft. Ten satellites were launched between 1989 and 2006; eight in the Orlets-1 configuration and two in the Orlets-2 configuration.

Orlets satellites conducted optical imaging, returning images by means of film capsules. Orlets-1 spacecraft carried eight film capsules, whilst Orlets-2 carried twenty-two. Orlets-1 were launched by Soyuz-U and Soyuz-U2 carrier rockets, with the larger Zenit-2 being used to launch Orlets-2.

Satellites

* — Orlets-1 missions terminated by self-destruct, Orlets-2 by controlled deorbit

References

Reconnaissance satellites of Russia
Reconnaissance satellites of the Soviet Union
Military equipment introduced in the 1980s